Walter Casson (22 January 1895 – 1965) was an English professional footballer who played as a forward.

References

1895 births
1965 deaths
People from Blyth, Northumberland
Footballers from Northumberland
English footballers
Association football forwards
Blyth Spartans A.F.C. players
South Shields F.C. (1889) players
Grimsby Town F.C. players
Pontypridd F.C. players
Exeter City F.C. players
English Football League players